Marlon Campbell (born 20 June 1983) is a Montserratian international footballer who plays for English club Bethnal Green United / Tower Hamlets, as a striker.

Career
Campbell has played club football in England for Bethnal Green United / Tower Hamlets.

He made his international debut for Montserrat in 2012, and competed in 2012 Caribbean Cup qualification.

References

1983 births
Living people
Montserratian footballers
Montserrat international footballers
Tower Hamlets F.C. players
Association football forwards
Montserratian expatriate footballers
Montserratian expatriate sportspeople in England
Expatriate footballers in England